Catiuscia Maria Stella Ricciarelli (born 16 January 1946), known as Katia Ricciarelli, is an Italian soprano and actress.

Biography
Born in Rovigo, Veneto, to a very poor family, she struggled during her younger years when she studied music.

She studied at the Benedetto Marcello Conservatory in Venice, won several vocal competitions in 1968, and made her professional debut as Mimì in La bohème in Mantua in 1969, followed by a 1970 appearance in Il trovatore in Parma.  In the following year, she won RAI's "Voci Verdiane" award.  Between 1972 and 1975, engagements followed in the major European and American opera houses, including Lyric Opera of Chicago (1972); Teatro alla Scala (1973); Royal Opera House, Covent Garden (1974); and the Metropolitan Opera in 1975.  In 1981, she began a decade-long association with the Rossini Opera Festival in Pesaro, thus broadening her repertoire of Rossini's operas.

Beside her many opera performances, she also appeared as Desdemona  in Franco Zeffirelli's film version of Verdi's Otello in 1986, alongside Plácido Domingo. In 2005 she won the best actress prize Nastro d'Argento, awarded by the Italian film journalists, for her role in Pupi Avati's La seconda notte di nozze.

In 1991 she founded Accademia Lirica di Katia Ricciarelli, and, since 2003, she has been Artistic Director of the annual summer Macerata Opera Festival. In 2006 she participated in the reality show La fattoria (Italian version of The Farm) on Canale 5.

In 1986, on her 40th birthday, she married Pippo Baudo, a television personality; she filed for divorce in the summer of 2004.

In 2021-2022 she participated in the reality show “Grande Fratello VIP” (Big Brother VIP 6), getting evicted after 165 days.

Discography (a selection)
 Verdi: Simon Boccanegra (under Gianandrea Gavazzeni, 1973) (RCA)
 Verdi: Un ballo in maschera (under Claudio Abbado, 1975) (Kultur DVD)
 Verdi: I due Foscari (under Lamberto Gardelli, 1976) (Philips)
 Verdi: La battaglia di Legnano (under Lamberto Gardelli, 1977) (Philips)
 Puccini: La bohème (under Sir Colin Davis, 1979) (Philips/Decca)
 Puccini: Tosca (under Herbert von Karajan, 1979) (Deutsche Grammophon)
 Verdi: Luisa Miller (under Lorin Maazel, 1979) (Deutsche Grammophon)
 Verdi: Un ballo in maschera (under Claudio Abbado, 1980) (Deutsche Grammophon)
 Verdi: Il trovatore (under Sir Colin Davis, 1980) (Philips)
 Verdi: Aida (under Claudio Abbado, 1981) (Deutsche Grammophon)
 Puccini: Turandot (as Turandot, under Herbert von Karajan, 1981) (Deutsche Grammophon); then (as Liù, under Lorin Maazel, 1983) (CBS/Sony)
 Bizet: Carmen (under Herbert von Karajan, 1982) (Deutsche Grammophon)
 Verdi: Falstaff (under Carlo Maria Giulini, 1982) (Deutsche Grammophon)
 Rossini: La donna del lago (under Maurizio Pollini, 1983) (CBS/Sony)
 Verdi: Don Carlos (under Claudio Abbado, 1982) (Deutsche Grammophon)
 Donizetti: L'elisir d'amore (under Claudio Scimone, 1984) (Philips)
 Verdi: Otello (under Lorin Maazel, 1986) (EMI)
 Rossini: La gazza ladra (under Gianluigi Gelmetti, 1990) (Sony)
 Bellini:  Messa No. 2 in G Minor and Giuseppe Geremia's Missa Pro Defunctis 1809 (under Douglas Bostock, 1997) (Classico)
 Verdi:  Un ballo in maschera (under Giuseppe Patanè, directed by Elijah Moshinsky, February 16, 1980, Metropolitan Opera) Paramount Home Video
 Various: The Metropolitan Opera Centennial Gala (22 October 1983), (Deutsche Grammophon DVD 00440-073-4538, 2009)

Filmography

Films

Television

Notes

1946 births
Living people
People from Rovigo
Italian operatic sopranos
Participants in Italian reality television series
Nastro d'Argento winners
Italian film actresses
21st-century Italian actresses
Österreichischer Kammersänger
20th-century Italian women  opera singers
Commandeurs of the Ordre des Arts et des Lettres